= Clemens Dvorak =

Austrian golfer (born 1988)

Clemens Dvorak (born 14 July 1988) is a European professional golfer from Vienna, Austria. Following a noteworthy amateur career in Europe and collegiate golf career in the United States, Dvorak turned pro in May 2013. In 2014, Dvorak led the 2014 Open Championship Regional Qualifying at East Sussex Golf Club with a five under par score of 67. In August 2015, Dvorak made his comeback from a wrist injury with a 4th-place finish in the Oaza Energo Czech PGA Stroke Play Championship. On 14 September 2015 Dvorak joined the short list of golfers who have hit an albatross in the first round of the ACP Masters.
